XHFA-FM is a radio station in Chihuahua City, Chihuahua, Mexico. It is owned by Grupo Radiorama and broadcasts a regional Mexican format on 89.3 FM.

History
XEFA-AM 950 received its concession on April 26, 1947. It was owned by Red Nacional Radioemisora, S.A., and broadcast with 500 watts during the day and 250 at night. It was transferred to its current concessionaire in 1976 and authorized to become an AM-FM combo in 1994. XEFA-AM was surrendered on November 1, 2019.

External links

References

Regional Mexican radio stations
Radio stations in Chihuahua
Mass media in Chihuahua City